Stevan Todd Ridley (born January 27, 1989) is a former American football running back. He played college football at LSU and was drafted by the New England Patriots in the third round of the 2011 NFL Draft. Ridley has also played for the New York Jets, Atlanta Falcons, Denver Broncos, Minnesota Vikings, and Pittsburgh Steelers. With the Patriots, he won Super Bowl XLIX over the Seattle Seahawks.

High school career
Ridley was born in Natchez, Mississippi. He attended Trinity Episcopal Day School in Natchez, where he played running back and linebacker for the Trinity Episcopal Saints high school football team. As a senior in 2007, he rushed for 3,086 yards and 38 touchdowns. He also competed in track, recording personal-bests of 11.25 seconds in the 100 meters and 23.42 seconds in the 200 meters.

College career
While at LSU, Ridley played from 2008–2010. As a freshman, he rushed for 12 times for 92 yards and a rushing touchdown. As a sophomore, he rushed 45 times for 180 yards and three rushing touchdowns. He rushed 249 times for a career-high of 1,147 yards and 15 touchdowns in the 2010 season while also serving as permanent team captain.

College statistics

Professional career

New England Patriots
Ridley was drafted in the third round of the 2011 NFL Draft with the 73rd overall pick by the New England Patriots, a round after the Patriots drafted another running back, Shane Vereen, with the 56th overall pick.

2011 season
Ridley scored his first NFL touchdown in Week 4 of his rookie season, in the Patriots' 31–19 win over the Oakland Raiders; he had 97 yards on 10 carries (for an average of 9.7 yards per carry), including a 33-yard touchdown run, and a three-yard reception. Overall, he finished his rookie season with 87 carries for 441 yards and a touchdown.

2012 season
In the regular season opener, Ridley had his best game of his early career in a 34–13 win over the Tennessee Titans. He had 125 yards on 21 carries and a touchdown, and also grabbed three catches out of the backfield for 27 yards. In Week 5, he topped his Week 1 performance with 151 yards rushing, with one touchdown, against the Denver Broncos. In his second year, he proved to be a dependable running back in the NFL after racking up 1,263 total yards on 290 carries, while scoring 12 rushing touchdowns during the regular season. His 82 first down rushes ranked third in the league among all NFL running backs. During the AFC Championship against the Baltimore Ravens on January 20, 2013, Ridley suffered a concussion after a head-to-head collision with Bernard Pollard, which also resulted in a fumble and a turnover. The Patriots lost to the Ravens by a score of 13–28.

2013 season
In the regular season opener, Ridley was benched in the second half of the game after losing a fumble. Ridley carried the ball nine times for 46 yards in the 23–21 win over the Buffalo Bills. After losing fumbles in three straight games, Ridley was a healthy scratch in the Patriots' Week 13 34–31 win over the Houston Texans. Plagued by the fumbling issues, Ridley lost significant playing time to LeGarrette Blount in his 2013 campaign, and finished the regular season with 178 carries for 773 yards with seven touchdowns. He also had 10 catches for 62 yards on the season, the most in his career. In the 2013–14 NFL playoffs, Ridley recorded his first career postseason multi-touchdown performance, rushing 14 times for 52 yards and two touchdowns in the Patriots' 43–22 Divisional Round win over the Indianapolis Colts.

2014 season
Ridley had his longest rush (43 yards) in his career on October 5 against the Cincinnati Bengals. During a Week 6 37–22 win against the Buffalo Bills, Ridley tore his anterior cruciate ligament and medial collateral ligament, which ended his season. Overall, he finished the 2014 season with 94 carries for 340 rushing yards and two rushing touchdowns.

Despite being on injured reserve, Ridley was a part of the Patriots Super Bowl XLIX team that defeated the defending champion Seattle Seahawks 28–24.

New York Jets
Ridley was signed by the New York Jets on April 13, 2015. During the 2015 season, Ridley played in eight games for the Jets, including one start, after missing the first half of the season due to a knee injury. He finished the season with 36 carries for 90 yards.

Detroit Lions
On April 5, 2016, Ridley signed a one-year contract with the Detroit Lions. On August 25, 2016, Ridley was released by the Lions.

Indianapolis Colts
On August 28, 2016, Ridley signed with the Indianapolis Colts. He was released by the team one week later on September 3.

Atlanta Falcons
On October 25, 2016, Ridley was signed by the Atlanta Falcons. On November 3, he appeared in a game against the Tampa Bay Buccaneers and had three carries for seven yards. He was released by the team on November 23, 2016.

Denver Broncos
On July 27, 2017, Ridley was signed by the Denver Broncos. He was released on September 2, 2017.

Minnesota Vikings
On October 5, 2017, Ridley signed with the Minnesota Vikings after a season-ending injury to rookie Dalvin Cook. On October 9, 2017, he was released by the Vikings.

Pittsburgh Steelers
On December 19, 2017, Ridley signed with the Pittsburgh Steelers. He appeared in two games in the regular season for the Steelers and had 108 rushing yards and a rushing touchdown.

On April 4, 2018, Ridley re-signed with the Steelers. He totaled 29 carries for 80 rushing yards and a rushing touchdown in the 2018 season.

NFL career statistics

References

External links
 
  

1989 births
Living people
Sportspeople from Natchez, Mississippi
Players of American football from Mississippi
American football running backs
LSU Tigers football players
New England Patriots players
New York Jets players
Detroit Lions players
Indianapolis Colts players
Atlanta Falcons players
Denver Broncos players
Minnesota Vikings players
Pittsburgh Steelers players